John Clifford Rose (24 October 1929 – 6 November 2021) was a British actor.

Life and career
Rose was born in Herefordshire. He was educated at the King's School, Worcester, and King's College London, before appearing in rep and began his association with the Royal Shakespeare Company in 1960. He played the character Sturmbannführer Ludwig Kessler in the BBC World War II television drama Secret Army (1977–79) and its sequel Kessler (1981). He later played SS General Hans Kammler in the miniseries War and Remembrance (1988). Rose played leading roles in The Pallisers (1974), Fortunes of War (1987) and Alan Bleasdale's drama GBH (1991), and appeared as Rorvik in the Doctor Who story Warriors' Gate (1981).

Rose also played a judge in some episodes of the 1970s/'80s British television series Crown Court and Dr Snell, an interrogative psychologist for "The Section" in the British 1960s/'70s spy drama Callan. He had a small part in an episode of Inspector Morse, "The Ghost in the Machine" (1989), as a college professor, Dr Charles Hudson.

Rose played King George V in the TV film Wallis and Edward (2005). In 2008, he appeared as Bishop Wood, in an episode of the ITV historical drama Foyle's War. In October 2010, Rose played the part of Father Gregory in the ITV crime drama Midsomer Murders, in the episode "Master Class". Rose played The Judge in Enid Bagnold's The Chalk Garden in a production at the Donmar Warehouse in summer 2008. A radio version of the staging was first broadcast on BBC Radio 3 in March 2011. He also played the Dean of Windsor in an episode of The Crown broadcast in 2019.

Rose was an RSC Honorary Associate Artist. He was the winner of the Clarence Derwent Award 2009 for his performance in The Chalk Garden at the Donmar.

Rose was married to Celia Ryder from 1957 until her death in 2012. They had two children, and lived in Stratford-upon-Avon. In September 2021, Rose moved into Denville Hall, a retirement home for theatrical professionals. He died there on 6 November 2021, at the age of 92.

Filmography
 Marat/Sade (1967) – Monsieur Coulmier
 Tell Me Lies (1968) – Guest
 Work Is a 4-Letter Word (1968) – Registry Office Clerk
 Lord Peter Wimsey (TV series) (The Unpleasantness at the Bellona Club) episode (1973) - Mr. Pritchard
 Callan (1974) – Dr. Snell
 The Good Father (1985) – Judge
 Terry on the Fence (1985) – Magistrate
 The Girl (1987) – General Carlsson
 Lover's Prayer (2001) – Dimitry
 Pirates of the Caribbean: On Stranger Tides (2011) – Bailiff
 The Iron Lady (2011) – James R

References

External links

1929 births
2021 deaths
Alumni of King's College London
English male television actors
Royal Shakespeare Company members
People from Herefordshire
20th-century English male actors
21st-century English male actors
English male film actors
People educated at King's School, Worcester